The Yukaghirs, or Yukagirs () are a Siberian ethnic group in the Russian Far East, living in the basin of the Kolyma River.

Geographic distribution

The Tundra Yukaghirs live in the Lower Kolyma region in the Sakha Republic; the Taiga Yukaghirs in the Upper Kolyma region in the Sakha Republic and in Srednekansky District of Magadan Oblast. By the time of Russian colonization in the 17th century, the Yukaghir tribal groups occupied territories from the Lena River to the mouth of the Anadyr River. The number of the Yukaghirs decreased between the 17th and 19th centuries due to epidemics, internecine wars and Tsarist colonial policy which may have included genocide against the sedentary hunter-fisher Anaouls. Some of the Yukaghirs have assimilated with the Yakuts, Evens, and Russians.

Currently, Yukaghirs live in the Sakha Republic and the Chukotka Autonomous Okrug of the Russian Federation. According to the 2002 Census, their total number was 1,509 people, up from 1,112 recorded in the 1989 Census.

According to the latest 2001 all Ukrainian census, 12 Yukaghirs are living in Ukraine. Only 2 of them indicated Yukaghir as their native language. For the remaining others (6) it is Russian and for 1 it is some other tongue.

Genetics 
Genetically, Yukaghirs exhibit roughly equal frequencies of the Y-DNA haplogroups N1c, Q1, and C2 (formerly C3). 

According to another study, out of 11 Yukaghir males 3 turned out to belong to the Y-haplogroup N1c (different subclade from the one found in Yakuts), another 4 - to the Y-haplogroup C2 (former C3; for the most part, the same subclade that's also found in Koryaks), one more - to the Y-haplogroup O, and the rest 3 exhibit apparent Russian genetic influence (two individuals belonging to the Y-haplogroup R1a, and one more - to the Y-haplogroup I2a). The study also found no similarities between Yukaghirs and Chukchis in regards to mitochondrial DNA.

Subethnic groups

The 13 tribes that once constituted the Yukaghir group are: Vadul-Alais, Odul, Chuvan, Anaoul, Lavren, Olyuben, Omok, Penjin, Khodynts, Khoromoy, Shoromboy, Yandin, and Yandyr. 

The surviving three tribes are the Odul of Nelemnoe, the Vadul of Andryushkino and the Chuvan of the Anadyr river area. Of the extinct groups, the most important were the Khodynts, the Anaoul (both of the Anadyr River area), and the Omok (north of the Chuvan). Sometimes the Chuvan are considered a separate tribe. The Chuvantsy language has been extinct since the early 20th century. In 2002, 1,087 identified themselves as Chuvan compared to more than 1,300 in 1989. The Vadul are mainly involved in reindeer herding while the Odul (Kogime) are mostly hunter-gatherers. The Vadul are also known as Tundra Yukaghir. The Odul are also known as Taiga Yukaghir or Kolyma Yukaghir. The Vadul and Odul languages are as different as German is from Dutch. Both are nearing extinction, and Odul is in a much weaker state compared to Vadul. In the 1989 census, more than 700 of the Yukaghirs identified as Vadul while fewer than 400 were Odul.

The Yukaghir are one of the oldest peoples in North-Eastern Asia. Originally they lived over a huge territory from Lake Baikal to the Arctic Ocean. By the time of the first encounter with Russians, Yukaghir were divided into twelve tribes with around 9,000 people. The Yukagir ethnonym is Odul or Vadul, which means “mighty”.

Tribal divisions among the Yukaghir are fading now, although in every census from 1926, significant number of tribesmen identified themselves with tribal divisions like Anaoul, Odul and Vadul rather than describing themselves as Yukaghir. The Soviet government actively discouraged this tendency and now only the most elderly identify this way. In the 2002 census, out of the 1,509 Yukaghirs, 51 identified themselves as Omok, 40 as Alais, 21 as Odul, 17 as Vadul, 6 as Khangait and 4 as Detkil.

Clan system
The head of every clan was an elder called a Ligey Shomorokh. His was the final word in all aspects of life. Hunting leaders were Khangitche, and war leaders were Tonbaia Shomorokh ("the mighty man"). Women and teenagers had equal voices with men. The internal life of the community was under the control of the older women. Their decisions in those matters were indisputable.

In the beginning of every summer all clans gathered for the Sakhadzibe festival, where mutual Yukaghir questions were discussed.

In the Yakut-Sakha Republic there are three nomadic extended family communities. These are Tchaila in Nizhnekolymsky District, Teki Odulok in Verkhnekolymsky District and Ianugail in Ust-Yansky District. The head of Ianugail is I. I. Tomsky. The community's main activities are deer hunting and fishing. Tchaila is the biggest of the three. Its head is S. I. Kurilov. They have 4000 domesticated reindeer, 200 horses, and 20 cows. The community also hunts deer and polar foxes. There is also a shop where traditional skin and fur garments are made. The head of Teki Odulok is N. I. Shalugin. Their base is the village of Nelemnoe. This community is in the most difficult situation. Due to the “creative interpretation” of various Perestroika and privatization laws by the local and district administration and so-called businessmen, the community has lost all their reindeer, cows and even part of its land. All they have left are about 50 horses. They have no money for supplies for hunting and fishing. 80% of all adult population is de facto unemployed.

The highest forum for Yukagir is the all-people gathering Suktuul.

Culture
The main traditional activity is nomadic and semi-nomadic hunting of deer, moose, wild sheep, and sable, as well as fishing. Reindeer are bred mostly for transportation. Horses are known among the Yukaghir as "domestic reindeer of Yakuts" (Yoqod ile in Tundra Yukaghir or Yaqad āçə in Kolyma Yukaghir). A Yukaghir house is called a chum.

The decline of traditional economic activities, the unfavorable environmental situation of the Yukaghir's traditional lands and waters, and the absence of local and federal laws and executive mechanisms protecting indigenous peoples in Russia, have not aided the welfare and continuation of traditional Yukaghir communities. The average life span for men is 45 years, and 54 years for women. Child mortality is the highest in the Yakut-Sakha Republic. In addition, one expedition made to the Yukaghir found that most had no knowledge of traditional Yukaghir culture.

Language
The Yukaghir languages are a small language family of two closely related languages, Tundra Yukaghir and Kolyma Yukaghir, although there used to be more. They are unclassified languages: their origin and relation to other languages are unknown; some scholars consider them distantly related to the Uralic languages, but this classification is not accepted by the majority of specialists in Uralic linguistics. The languages are regarded as moribund, since less than 370 people can speak either Yukaghir language. Most Yukaghirs today speak Yakut and Russian.

Religion
Alongside Russian Orthodox beliefs, Yukaghirs still practice shamanism. The dominant cults are ancestral spirits, the spirits of Fire, Sun (Pugu), Hunting, Earth, and Water, which can act as protectors or as enemies of people. The most important is the cult of Pugu, the Sun, who is the highest judge in all disputes. The spirits of the dead go to a place called Aibidzi. Every clan had a shaman called an alma. After death every alma was treated as a deity, and the body of the dead alma was dismembered and kept by the clan as relics. The Yukaghir still continue traditions stemming from their origins as nomadic reindeer-hunters: they practice dog sacrifice and have an epic poem based around crows. The animal cult was especially strong in the elk cult. There was a number of rituals and taboos connected with elk and deer hunting.

See also
Paleosiberian languages
Uralic–Yukaghir languages
Uralic
Eurasiatic
Nostratic
Yukaghir birch-bark carvings

References

Notes
  Also free online available audio materials (tales, songs).

Footnotes

External links
 Yukaghir portal in Arctic Megapedia  

Modern culture:

 Irina Duskulova - "Chakhadan" (live, w/ English subtitles)
 Irina Duskulova - "Ulegen Nume" (music video)
 Concert @ 5th Yukaghir congress (20 March 2016)

 
Ethnic groups in Russia
Ethnic groups in Siberia
Indigenous peoples of North Asia
Indigenous small-numbered peoples of the North, Siberia and the Far East
Indigenous peoples in the Arctic
Hunter-gatherers of Asia
Modern nomads
Nomadic groups in Eurasia
People from Chukotka Autonomous Okrug
People from Magadan Oblast
People from the Sakha Republic